Rehab Nazzal is a Palestinian-born multidisciplinary artist based in Toronto, Ontario, Canada.

Life 
Nazzal holds a PhD in Art and Visual Culture from the University of Western Ontario (Canada), an MFA from Ryerson University (Toronto), a BFA from the University of Ottawa, and a BA in Economics from Damascus University (Syria).

Work 
Nazzal uses sound, video and the photographic image in her work to present contemporary war technology and its destructive effect on civilians, residential dwellings, infrastructures, and the environment. Often, her work creates immersive environments that represent the tragic conditions in Palestine with previous bodies of work centered on Gaza, the Negev Prison and the village of Bil’in.

Nazzal's 2014 exhibition Invisible at the Karsh-Masson Art Gallery on the ground floor of city hall in Ottawa was publicly condemned by Israel's ambassador to Canada, Rafael Barak. The exhibition included images of Palestinian prisoners in Israeli prisons, among other art pieces that portray the West Bank and Gaza.

Invisible featured four videos and 1,700 photographs. One video, Bil'in, was about Nazzal's experience in the village of Bil'in where Palestinians and members of international solidarity movements were physically attacked by the Israel Defense Forces during a weekly protest against land confiscation. Nazzal kept the sound intact and reconstructed the image to "represent the feeling of being suffocated and blinded by tear gas." Another video, Target, consisted of over 127 flashing images of Palestinians who were extrajudicially assassinated across the world or in occupied Palestine. Nazzal edited the images to flash quickly as a formal choice to represent the fact that these individuals's lives were cut short.

In 2014 Nazzal's work was exhibited at the Art Gallery of Mississauga. The exhibition, titled Visible, was an immersive installation using found images alongside sound and video works that confronted viewers with the destruction wrought by the violence in Gaza.

In 2012, Nazzal's work was exhibited in, A Refusal of Images, a group show at A Space Gallery, in Toronto curated by Vicky Moufawad-Paul.

In 2010, ''Divide'', a solo exhibition of Nazzal's photographs was on display at Gallery 101 in Ottawa.

Nazzal has exhibited her work internationally, including at the International Yellowknife Film Festival, Montreal Palestine Film festival, SAW video for the Media Arts, International Mini Print Festival, Gallery 101, and Ottawa X-photography Festival.

Nazzal has received numerous awards and grants including Edmund and Isobel Ryan Visual Arts award in photography, University of Ottawa, Documentary Photography for Social Justice Award, Ryerson University, Ontario Graduate Scholarship, Ryerson University Scholarship.

Shooting 
In December 2015, Nazzal was shot in the leg by a sniper while in Israel, photographing activities of the Israeli Defense Force.

References 

Artists from Toronto
Canadian multimedia artists
Canadian installation artists
Canadian photographers
Toronto Metropolitan University alumni
Palestinian emigrants to Canada
Living people
Date of birth missing (living people)
Year of birth missing (living people)